Patricia Dehaney is an American make-up artist. She won an Academy Award and was nominated for one more in the category Best Makeup and Hairstyling for the films Vice and Hillbilly Elegy.

Selected filmography 
 Vice (2018; co-won with Greg Cannom and Kate Biscoe)
 Hillbilly Elegy (2020; co-nominated with Eryn Krueger Mekash and Matthew W. Mungle)

References

External links 

Living people
Year of birth missing (living people)
Place of birth missing (living people)
American make-up artists
Best Makeup Academy Award winners